Myles William Patrick O'Reilly (13 March 1825 in Balbriggan, Ireland – 6 February 1880 in Dublin, Ireland) was a Catholic soldier, MP and publicist.

He was the only son of William O'Reilly of Thomastown (Knock Abbey) Castle, County Louth and was educated at Ushaw College in County Durham and at London University. He entered the Middle Temple in 1848. He succeeded his father to Knock Abbey Castle in 1844 and was selected High Sheriff of Louth for 1848–49.

Career

He was commissioned a captain in the Louth Rifles in 1854, a British militia unit. When the Roman crisis arose he offered his services to Pope Pius IX against Giuseppe Garibaldi who had launched the "Expedition of the Thousand". Raising and leading an Irish battalion of 900 men, known as "The Battalion of St Patrick", he fought in the 18-day war until the surrender of Spoleto in September 1860. On the losing side at the Battle of Castelfidardo, the Papal States were soon reduced to the province of Lazio around Rome. Some of his men joined the "Papal Zouaves" after the war.

Subsequently, he was elected a Member of Parliament for the Longford division from 1862 to 1879, when he was appointed the Assistant Commissioner of Intermediate Education, and was one of the founders of the Irish Home Rule League (1873–82). In addition to his historical Sufferings for the Faith in Ireland (1868), his pen was ever active in defence of the Holy See and Catholic interests.

On his death in 1880 he was buried in the family burial-ground at Philipstown, near Knock Abbey. He had married in 1859 Ida Jerningham and had 4 sons and 2 daughters. He was succeeded by his eldest son William Joseph O'Reilly.

See also
 Second Italian War of Independence

Notes

References
1910 New Catholic Dictionary

Major O'Reilly article (MS Word doc) Louth County Council
Genealogy of O'Reilly family

External links 
 

1825 births
1880 deaths
People from Balbriggan
Alumni of the University of London
Members of the Middle Temple
Irish soldiers in Italy
Members of the Parliament of the United Kingdom for County Longford constituencies (1801–1922)
UK MPs 1868–1874
UK MPs 1874–1880
High Sheriffs of County Louth
People of the Italian unification
Alumni of Ushaw College
Irish Liberal Party MPs